Peridroma clerica is a moth of the family Noctuidae. It is found from Valparaíso to the Magallanes and Antartica Chilena Region in Chile and Chubut and Neuquén in Argentina.

The wingspan is 40–46 mm. Adults are on wing from August to May.

Larval food plants include beet, tomato and clover.

External links
 Noctuinae of Chile

Noctuinae
Moths described in 1882